The 1975 Pro Bowl was the NFL's 25th annual all-star game which featured the outstanding performers from the 1974 season. The game was played on Monday, January 20, 1975, at the Orange Bowl in Miami, Florida. The final score was NFC 17, AFC 10. James Harris of the Los Angeles Rams was named the game's Most Valuable Player.

Attendance at the game was 26,484. John Madden of the Oakland Raiders coached the AFC while the NFC was led by the Los Angeles Rams' Chuck Knox. The referee for the game was Dick Jorgensen. It was the first of five straight Pro Bowls played on ABC's Monday Night Football package.

AFC roster

Offense

Defense

Special teams

NFC roster

Offense

Defense

Special teams

References

External links

Pro Bowl
Pro Bowl
Pro Bowl
Pro Bowl
American football in Miami
Sports competitions in Miami
January 1975 sports events in the United States